The 1960 Big Ten Conference football season was the 65th season of college football played by the member schools of the Big Ten Conference and was a part of the 1960 NCAA University Division football season.

The 1960 Minnesota Golden Gophers football team, under head coach Murray Warmath, compiled an 8–2 record, won the Big Ten championship, led the conference in scoring defense (8.8 points allowed per game), and lost to Washington in the 1961 Rose Bowl.  The Golden Gophers were ranked No. 1 in the AP and Coaches Polls, both of which were released prior to the Rose Bowl. Guard Tom Brown was a consensus first-team All-American, won the Outland Trophy as college football's best interior lineman, finished second in the Heisman Trophy voting, and received the Chicago Tribune Silver Football as the Big Ten's most valuable player. 

The 1960 Iowa Hawkeyes football team, in its final season under head coach Forest Evashevski, compiled an 8–1 record, led the Big Ten in scoring offense (26.0 points per game), and was ranked No. 3 in the final AP Poll and No. 2 in the final Coaches' Poll.  Iowa's only loss was against Minnesota. Halfback Larry Ferguson, quarterback Wilburn Hollis, and guard Mark Manders were first-team All-Big Ten players.

The conference's statistical leaders included Ron Miller of Wisconsin with 1,351 passing yards, Bob Ferguson of Ohio State with 853 rushing yards and 78 points scored, Elbert Kimbrough of Northwestern with 378 receiving yards, and Tom Matte of Ohio State with 1,419 yards of total offense.

Season overview

Results and team statistics

Key
AP final = Team's rank in the final AP Poll of the 1960 season
AP high = Team's highest rank in the AP Poll throughout the 1960 season
PPG = Average of points scored per game
PAG = Average of points allowed per game
MVP = Most valuable player as voted by players on each team as part of the voting process to determine the winner of the Chicago Tribune Silver Football trophy; trophy winner in bold

Preseason

Regular season

Bowl games

Post-season developments

Statistical leaders

The Big Ten's individual statistical leaders for the 1960 season include the following:

Passing yards

Rushing yards

Receiving yards

Total yards

Scoring

Awards and honors

All-Big Ten honors

The following players were picked by the Associated Press (AP) and/or the United Press International (UPI) as first-team players on the 1960 All-Big Ten Conference football team.

All-American honors

At the end of the 1960 season, Big Ten players secured two of the 11 consensus first-team picks for the 1960 College Football All-America Team. The Big Ten's consensus All-Americans were:

Other Big Ten players who were named first-team All-Americans by at least one selector were:

Other awards
Minnesota's Tom Brown won the Outland Trophy as the best interior lineman in college football. He also finished second in the voting for the Heisman Trophy. Ohio State quarterback Tom Matte of finished seventh in the Heisman voting.

1961 NFL Draft
The following Big Ten players were among the first 100 picks in the 1961 NFL Draft:

References